Marshall County Correctional Center (MCCF) is a for-profit prison in Holly Springs, Marshall County, Mississippi, managed by Management and Training Corporation (MTC) on behalf of the Mississippi Department of Corrections.

The Marshall County Correctional Facility is one of three private prisons operated on behalf of the state as of March 2017.

In November 2014, Mississippi Corrections Commissioner Chris Epps resigned a day before he was indicted by the US Department of Justice (DOJ) on corruption charges for bribery and taking kickbacks. Commissioner since 2002, he was known for reducing the use of solitary confinement in state prisons, and reducing prison populations after supporting passage of a 2009 bill allowing earlier parole for non-violent offenders with a low risk of recidivism. Cecil McCrory, a business man and former state legislator, was indicted for bribing Epps in return for having prison-services contracts steered to him and his clients. He had worked as a consultant for MTC, GEO Group, and Cornell Companies, which had previously operated private prisons in Mississippi. By November 2015 both men had pleaded guilty and were cooperating with law enforcement in the investigation. A third co-conspirator, former lawmaker Irb Benjamin, also joined the lengthening list of those pleading out to reduce the consequences of their crimes.

In 2009, the Mississippi Supreme Court reinstated a  2006 lawsuit filed pro se by ex-inmate Dennis Dobbs over conditions at the MCCF. He complained of a lack of air conditioning, ventilation and concerns regarding fire safety including an absence of sprinklers. The Supreme Court said that a Marshall County judge erred in dismissing the lawsuit. The justices said the Chancery court judge erroneously considered Dennis Dobbs' lawsuit as an appeal of his assault conviction prosecuted in another county. The Supreme Court said Dobbs' tort, for what he referred to as "inhumane" conditions at the Marshall County prison warranted a hearing.

In March 2015, corrections officials conducted a search at the MCCF and the state's three other for-profit prisons, seizing weapons (including 36 homemade knives), cell phones, and other prohibited materials at MCCF. "We believe there were some staff complicit in bringing in contraband," Corrections Commissioner Marshall Fisher said, noting one had already resigned, and that four additional staff members were suspected of complicity.

Then U.S. Attorney Brad Pigott said the quantities of weapons seized leads him to believe that contraband weapons are more common at for-profit prisons. "This makes clear that prisons operated by corporations are much more dangerous places to work." Private prisons are using money "which could have gone into hiring enough guards to find and remove knives from prisoners, and they are sending those tax dollars instead to their corporate headquarters," he continued. According to Issa Arnita, MTC's spokesperson, "Employees caught attempting to bring contraband into our facilities will not only be terminated but will be criminally prosecuted to the highest extent of the law."

On November 22, 2016, inmate Oscar Pirtle was killed in an altercation with another inmate.

On April 23, 2019, after a guard was assaulted by an inmate in a housing units, he was taken by ambulance and hospitalized, said MTC spokesperson Issa Arnita. 
The Marshall County Sheriff reported that a fire broke out during the incident. Arnita did not mention the fire nor return requests for further comment. On April 25, the Clarion Ledger newspaper received five videos plus two photos taken by a Marshall County inmate's phone. They showed a smoke-filled prison with soot high on the walls. According to the inmate, "If not for the fire sprinkler going off, I can assure you every inmate on the zone of delta 4 in Marshall county correctional facility would have died!" In the videos, smoke fills the prison and reached the cell block ceiling. It was reported that the facility had been on lockdown for four months.

References

External links

Prisons in Mississippi
Buildings and structures in Holly Springs, Mississippi
Infrastructure completed in 1996
1996 establishments in Mississippi
Management and Training Corporation
Political scandals in Mississippi